Interstate 74 (I-74) in the US state of Illinois is a major northwest–southeast Interstate Highway that runs across the central portion of the state. The highway runs through the major cities of Champaign, Bloomington, Peoria, and Moline.

The highway is officially named after Everett McKinley Dirksen, a Republican senator and representative from Pekin from 1933 to his death in 1969.

Route description 
I-74 in Illinois runs parallel with U.S. Route 6 (US 6) in the Quad Cities, US 150 from the Quad Cities to Danville, and US 136 east of Danville.

Iowa state line to Bloomington–Normal 
After crossing the Iowa state line and the Mississippi River via the I-74 Bridge (through arch span), I-74, as well as US 6, enters the city of Moline. At first, the freeway travels southward, meeting River Drive, Illinois Route 92 (IL 92, 6th Avenue), 7th Avenue, Avenue of the Cities, and IL 5 (John Deere Road), before reaching I-280. Near the Quad Cities International Airport, I-74 turns eastward along I-280 while US 6 continues south for a short distance. Southeast of Colona, I-280 ends at the Big X interchange while I-74 turns southward via ramps. This interchange is also where I-80 turns east via ramps. At this point, I-74 runs along IL 110 all the way to Galesburg. Along the way, the freeway comes across IL 81 and IL 17 before meeting US 34. At this point, IL 110 travels west along US 34 while I-74 continues south.

East of Galesburg, I-74 begins to curve southeastward. Along the way, it meets US 150 in Knoxville, local roads near Brimfield, and one near Kickapoo before meeting I-474/IL 6. I-474 serves as a southern bypass of Peoria. Along the way through Peoria, it comes across Sterling Avenue, then US 150, Gale Avenue, University Street, IL 40, IL 29 (where they become concurrent), and the Murray Baker Bridge. East of Peoria, the freeway then meets IL 40 (Riverfront Drive), US 24/US 150/IL 29 (where IL 29 leaves the concurrency)/IL 116, US 150/IL 8, and Pinecrest Drive, before meeting I-474 again. After the I-474 interchange, it then meets the I-155 interchange, as well as Morton Avenue, in Morton. The freeway then meets IL 117 in Goodfield, a local road near Carlock, and US 150 near Yuton. As it approaches Normal, I-74 then meets I-55/US 51 at a trumpet interchange, which then turns south.

Bloomington–Normal to Indiana state line 
The concurrency then meets US 150 in Bloomington before I-55 branches southwestward at the I-55 Business (I-55 Bus.) interchange. After that, US 51 branches southward at US 51 Bus. I-74 then travels southeastward at this point. Along the way, it meets two local roads serving Downs and Le Roy, respectively; US 136; IL 54; another local road near Mansfield; IL 47; and another local road near Mahomet. As it approaches Champaign, it then comes across I-57, then Prospect Avenue, and then Neil Street. For Urbana, it serves Lincoln Avenue, US 45, and IL 130. After leaving the city of Urbana, it then serves two local roads for St. Joseph and Ogden, IL 49, another local road for Oakwood, and US 150. At this point, I-74 becomes a freeway bypass of Danville. In Tilton, it serves G Street as well as US 150/IL 1. After crossing the Vermilion River, it then meets Bowman Road and Lynch Road. Shortly after the Lynch Road interchange, I-74 crosses the Indiana state line.

History 

In November 2006, major work was completed on the Upgrade 74 project for the portion of I-74 in the Midwest. This multiyear project, begun in April 2002, saw the complete renovation of I-74 through East Peoria and Peoria. Most notably, the Interstate was widened to three lanes through the cities, many blind or hairpin exits and entrances to the highway were removed or corrected, and many bridges crossing the highway were replaced. The biggest part of this project was to work on the Murray Baker Bridge, over which I-74 crosses the Illinois River. The bridge was completely closed to traffic while being partially dismantled and reconstructed from April 2 to October 15, 2005. During this time, I-74 was disconnected between Peoria and East Peoria. In late March 2013, the biggest road reconstruction project in the Peoria area since the 2002–2006 project—a complete $86.6-million (equivalent to $ in ) revision of the Morton I-74/I-155 interchange system—started its beginning phases (Morton, a hub for the two Interstates and the site of facilities for Caterpillar Inc., PepsiCo, and Libby's, is a growing Peoria suburb, across the Illinois River, east of East Peoria and Pekin, in Tazewell County). This latest project was scheduled to be finished by mid-2016, and the reconstruction is being scheduled in phases to minimize traffic disruption. In 2020, the Murray Baker Bridge was closed for seven months for a $42.2-million project. At the end of October, it reopened with new decorative and traffic lights.

I-74 Bridge replacement project

The Iowa Department of Transportation (Iowa DOT) and Illinois Department of Transportation (IDOT) were in the planning stages to build a new bridge to replace the aging I-74 Bridge. The Iowa-bound bridge opened in 1935; the Illinois-bound bridge in 1958. In addition to replacing the twin bridges, the scope of the bistate coalition's plan includes updating  of I-74 mainline and interchanges from 53rd Street in Davenport to the Avenue of the Cities in Moline. The new twin span fully opened on December 1, 2021.

Exit list

References

External links

 Illinois
74
Transportation in Rock Island County, Illinois
Transportation in Henry County, Illinois
Transportation in Knox County, Illinois
Transportation in Peoria County, Illinois
Transportation in Tazewell County, Illinois
Transportation in Woodford County, Illinois
Transportation in McLean County, Illinois
Transportation in DeWitt County, Illinois
Transportation in Piatt County, Illinois
Transportation in Champaign County, Illinois
Transportation in Vermilion County, Illinois